Showing Up is a 2022 American comedy-drama film co-written and directed by Kelly Reichardt, in her fourth collaboration with actress Michelle Williams. The film competed for the Palme d'Or at the 2022 Cannes Film Festival, where it premiered on May 27. 

The film is scheduled to be released on April 7, 2023, by A24.

Premise
An artist on the verge of a career-changing exhibition finds inspiration in the chaos of life.

Cast

Source:

Production
On January 26, 2021, it was announced that Michelle Williams would star in Showing Up, in her fourth collaboration with writer-director Kelly Reichardt after Wendy and Lucy, Meek's Cutoff, and Certain Women. In June 2021, Hong Chau, Judd Hirsch, Maryann Plunkett, John Magaro, André Benjamin, Heather Lawless, Amanda Plummer, Larry Fessenden and James Le Gros joined the cast. Principal photography began on June 7, 2021, and concluded on July 15, 2021, in Portland, Oregon.

Reception

References

External links
 

2022 films
2022 comedy-drama films
2020s American films
2020s English-language films
A24 (company) films
American comedy-drama films
Films directed by Kelly Reichardt
Films set in Portland, Oregon
Films shot in Portland, Oregon